Janina Sara Maria Ramirez  (Maleczek; born 7 July 1980), sometimes credited as Nina Ramirez, is a British art historian, cultural historian, and TV presenter. She specialises in interpreting symbols and examining works of art within their historical context.

Education and academic career
Ramirez went to school in Slough, Berkshire. She gained a degree in English literature, specialising in Old and Middle English, from St Anne's College, Oxford, before completing her postgraduate studies at the Centre for Medieval Studies, University of York. She completed a PhD on the artistic and literary symbolism of birds, which led to a lectureship in York's Art History Department, followed by lecturing posts at the University of Winchester, University of Warwick, and University of Oxford.

Until 2021, Ramirez was the course director on the Certificate in History of Art at Oxford University's Department for Continuing Education. In 2021, Ramirez became Research Fellow in History of Art at Harris Manchester College, University of Oxford.

Personal life
Her grandfather was Polish. Ramirez and her Spanish husband have two children. At 14, she played bass in a band with Krissi Murison as lead singer. Ramirez was in a punk band while at Oxford but chose finishing her degree over touring with the band.

Television career 
 Treasures of the Anglo-Saxons, BBC Four, August 2010
 The Viking Sagas, BBC Four, May 2011
 Britain's Most Fragile Treasure, BBC Four, October 2011
 Illuminations: The Private Lives of Medieval Kings, 3-part series, BBC Four, January 2012
 Chivalry and Betrayal: The Hundred Years' War, 3-part series, BBC Four, February 2013
 Architects of the Divine: The First Gothic Age, BBC Four, October 2014
 Saints and Sinners: Britain's Millennium of Monasteries, 3-part series, BBC Four, February 2015
 The Quizeum, A museum-based quiz panel show, BBC Four, April 2015 
 The Search for the Lost Manuscript: Julian of Norwich, BBC Four, July 2016
 An Art Lover's Guide, BBC Four, May 2017
 In Search of Arcadia, BBC Four, August 2017
 England's Reformation: Three Books that Changed a Nation, BBC Four, October 2017
 Art on BBC: The Genius of Leonardo Da Vinci, BBC Four, May 2018
 Raiders of the Lost Past with Janina Ramirez BBC Four, September 2019 - 1 The Sutton Hoo Hoard (broadcast 4 September 2019)
 Handmade in Bolton – presenter, featuring Shaun Greenhalgh and narrated by Waldemar Januszczak, BBC Four, October 2019
 Lost Worlds and Hidden Treasures, 3-part series, Apple TV, May 2021

Publications

References

External links
 
 Janina Ramirez at United Agents
 Janina Ramirez – BBC Blog
 
 Dr Janina Ramirez: Art Detective – Laluma Podcast

1980 births
21st-century English historians
Living people
Academics of the University of Oxford
Academics of the University of Warwick
Academics of the University of Winchester
Academics of the University of York
Alumni of St Anne's College, Oxford
Alumni of the University of York
English art historians
Women art historians
English people of Polish descent
English television presenters